First Lady is the debut album by English singer and former member of So Solid Crew, Lisa Maffia. It was released in the UK on September 22, 2003 and internationally on January 6, 2004. The first single, "All Over", was released in the UK on April 24, 2003.

Track listing
 "Swiss Intro"
 "All Over" (featuring JD, Megaman and Swiss)
 "Women of the World" (featuring Thug Angel)
 "Down" (featuring JD)
 "Wrong Guys" (featuring Thug Angel and Smetz)
 "So Solid Party" (featuring Tiger S and Face)
 "JD Interlude"
 "In Love"
 "Life" (featuring Face)
 "City Life" (featuring Face)
 "Super Freak" (featuring Swiss)
 "Always Be Your Angel"
 "Out of My Life"
 "Night Crawler" (featuring Megaman)
 "Outro (Slowdown Zone)" (featuring Romeo, Thug Angel and Swiss)
 "All Over" (Remix) (Japanese bonus track)
 "In Love" (Remix) (Japanese bonus track)

Charts

References

2003 debut albums
Epic Records albums
Contemporary R&B albums by English artists